The Weblog Awards, nicknamed the Bloggies, was an annual non-profit blog awards that began in 2001. Until its end in 2015, it was  the longest running and one of the largest blog awards, with winners determined through internet voting by the public. The Weblog Awards were presented by Nikolai Nolan, and was covered by many major news organizations.

In 2015, Nolan announced an end to the competition, stating that "Visitor participation has declined to the point where there just aren't enough nominees to form a broad enough spectrum of competition."

Awards
Entries are alphabetical; winners are in bold:

2001
2001 was the first year that the Weblog Awards was held.

Culture
Article or essay about weblogs: Deconstructing "You've Got Blog"; Ten Tips For Building A Bionic Weblog; Weblogs: A History and Perspective; What the Hell Is a Weblog, and Why Won't They Leave Me Alone?; You've Got Blog
Meme: A Day With(out) Weblogs; Hiding blog names in source code; The "A-List"; The "Little Girl On a Bike" story
Web application for weblogs: Blogger; BlogVoices; GreyMatter; Manila; Pitas.com
Weblog directory or update monitor: Blog.Start; Blogger; EatonWeb Portal; SubHonker Filter; Weblogs.com
Weblog resource: Blogger; The Bling Dictionary; Weblog Madness; Weblog Resources FAQ; Weblog, Theory and Practice
Weblog webring: Aussie Blogs; BlogCanada; BlogPhiles; Linksluts; Webloggers

Origin
Asian weblog: Daily Bread; GMTPlus9; IritibilitaLog; Poppycock; Weblog Wannabe
Australian or New Zealand weblog: Design Is Kinky; Loobylu; Virulent Memes; Waferbaby
Canadian weblog: 2xy.org=f(ab); Have Browser, Will Travel; Pith and Vinegar; SuccaLand; Weblog Shmeblog
European weblog: Kitsch...; LukeLog; Not.So.Soft; PlasticBag.org; Prolific
Latin American weblog: Eduardo Arcos; PoseidonZone; Pura Vida; Rafael Nevarez: Ese Soy Yo; Zamorim

Accessory
Designed weblog: EvHead; Kottke..org; Loobylu; NoahGreyCom; Saturn.org
Non-weblog content of a weblog site: Fairvue Central; Harrumph; WaferBaby; Wetlog;Zeldman.com
Tagline of a weblog: Blogger; Harrumph; MemePool; MetaFilter: "More addictive than crack"; Virulent Memes
Webcam of a weblog site: EvHead; Fairvue Central; Kottke.org; MegNut

Theme
Computers or technology weblog: Ars Technica; GeekNews; Hack the Planet; Kuro5hin; Slashdot
Temporary or periodic weblog: Born, Eat, Shag, Die: The Mayfly Project; SurvivorBlog; SXSWb; The 5K; The Great Blog-Off
Topical weblog: Disturbing Search Requests; Guardian Unlimited: The Weblog; Librarian.net; New York, London, Paris, Munich; U2Log.com
Weblog about weblogs: Borrowed Blogs; Haiku the Blog; MetaCubed; The Dark Ages of Weblogging; Webloglog

Character
GLBT weblog: 2xy.org=f(ab); Leather Egg; Must See HTTP; PlasticBag.org; Web Queeries
Humorous weblogs: Disturbing Search Requests; Harrumph; RiotHero; Torrez.org; Wetlog
Group or community weblog: Disturbing Search Requests; MemePool; MetaFilter; Slashdot; Web Queeries

Process
Blogger-powered weblog: Harrumph; Prolific; Saturn.org; Swallowing Tacks; /USR/Bin/Girl
Manila-powered weblog: Disturbing Search Requests; Doc Searls Weblog; Hack the Planet; Q; Scripting News
PITAS-powered weblog: Catherine's Pita; Deletia; Openlog; Ribbit; Wisdom
Programming of a website: CamWorld; Fairvue Central; Kottke.org; MetaFilter; WaferBaby

Quality
Best-kept-secret weblog: A Curmudgeon Teaches Statistics; Consolation Champs; Digital Swirlee; Follow Me Here; Wockerjabby
Lifetime achievement: Cameron Barrett; Dave Winer; Jeffrey Zeldman; Jorn Barger; Jason Kottke
New weblog: Lines and Splines; Little Yellow Different; Re-run; ThinkDink; Weblog Wannabe
Weblog of the year: Harrumph; MetaFilter; Not.So.Soft; PlasticBag.org; Saturn.org; /Usr/Bin/Girl

Notes

References

External links 
 The Weblog Awards

Blog awards
Awards established in 2001
Awards disestablished in 2015